Trilling Islands is a three islands at the south side of Skarvsnes Foreland, lying in Trilling Bay in the east part of Lutzow-Holm Bay. Mapped by Norwegian cartographers from air photos taken by the Lars Christensen Expedition, 1936–37, and named Trillingoyane (the triplet islands).

See also 
 List of antarctic and sub-antarctic islands

Islands of Queen Maud Land
Prince Harald Coast